Anastasia Sidorova (born 28 September 1996 in Volgograd, Russia) is a Russian artistic gymnast. She won three titles at the 2011 Russian junior championships. In 2012, she won silver in the team competition at the 2012 European Championships.

Competitive history

References

External links
Personal website

Russian female artistic gymnasts
1996 births
Living people
People from Rostov
Sportspeople from Volgograd
21st-century Russian women